The Red Army invasion of Azerbaijan, also known as the Sovietization or Soviet invasion of Azerbaijan, was a military campaign carried out by the 11th Army of Soviet Russia in April 1920 to install a new Soviet government in the Azerbaijan Democratic Republic. The invasion coincided with the anti-government insurrection staged by the local Azerbaijani Bolsheviks in the capital, Baku, and led to the dissolution of the Azerbaijan Democratic Republic and the establishment of the Azerbaijan Soviet Socialist Republic.

Background

In early January 1920, the word came from Moscow that all national organizations had to be liquidated and join the Communist party of the region where they are located. The newly created Communist Party would include all nationalities in Azerbaijan without dividing them into Muslims or Turks as was with "Himmat" which now had to be ceased. The new organization was called the Azerbaijan Communist Party (AzCP). Even though the "Himmat" was dissolved, the members of this party did not protest, because in the Constituent Congress of the AzCP the majority of participants were Muslims. So, Himmat had as many representatives as the Russian Communist Party did – 30, another 30 belonged to Adalat, and an additional 60 belonged to other Communist cells, which were mostly Himmatists as well.

Everything started with the first note in the beginning of January 1920 from the Commissar of Foreign Affairs of Soviet Russian, Georgy Chicherin, to the Prime Minister Fatali Khan Khoyski. In this note, Chicherin demanded to create an alliance against Denikin, who was the leading general of the White movement. This was done in order to engage Azerbaijan Democratic Republic in the exhaustive civil war, which would take enormous effort in an equal fight. The Allied Supreme court reacted to the Soviet pressure and sent military aid to Azerbaijan. Fatali Khan Khoyski, who believed that the Allies were to come on time, refused the first demand of Chicherin.

In his second note to Khoyski, Chicherin accused the Azerbaijani government of not joining the Russian army against its enemy. He also repeated his demands, which again were not met by Khoyski. Instead, in his reply at the beginning of February, Khoyski insisted on recognition of Azerbaijan as a sovereign and independent country, before they move on to further discussions. Chicherin, on his next note, stated that there is no advantage in recognizing Azerbaijan as an independent country and that the Soviets take the demands and notes of Khoyski as a rejection of its proposals.

Meanwhile, the AzCP was observing an increase in the number of followers of this ideology. The number of members reached 4,000 people by late April 1920.  People were mainly advocating how Azerbaijan had to surrender to Soviet Russia because this was the only way to save the republic.  One of the most prominent followers of this idea was the interior minister of that time, Mammad Hasan Hajinski. Even after Hajinski was moved to another, less central position in the cabinet of ministers, he continued his pro-Russian economically directed activities, such as selling oil to the Soviet. 

On 23 March 1920, the Armenians started protesting in Karabakh with the support of Yerevan. The government of Azerbaijan reacted by sending most of its army to that region and leaving Baku and North regions with little protection. Meanwhile, Russian troops–the Bolshevik Eleventh Army–were conquering North Caucasus, including Dagestan, and coming closer to the borders of Azerbaijan.

By early 1920, Soviet Russia desperately needed oil supplies from Baku. On 17 March 1920, Vladimir Lenin sent the following telegraph to the Revolutionary Military Council on the Caucasus Front:

After, he appointed Serebrovsky to take control over Baku oil. Sergo Ordzhonikidze and his deputy Sergey Kirov had to take military actions directed to conquest of the territory under the special body of Caucasian Bureau. Being confused, Khoyski sent a note to Chicherin on 15 April, demanding an explanation of the reasons Bolshevik troops were approaching Azerbaijan borders. However, Chicherin sent no reply.

The political situation was also changing in the country; members of Menshevik-oriented Himmat were joining the Communist Party, while the Ittihad party also was losing its members to the AzCP. Ussubakov's government, which lost the support of Ittihad due to the movement of members to CP, resigned on 1 April. Hajinski took advantage of this situation and to form a new cabinet. Hajinski was continuously negotiating with Halil Pasha, who saw the former as a friend of Turkey. Together with AzCP, they drafted the resolution, which stated that there was no need for a Red Army invasion since the Turkish Communist Party and AzCP were going to organize an internal coup. They also received confirmation from the 11th Army that the latter would not intervene for a period of 24-hour.

Military operation
On 21 April 1920, Tukhachevsky issued the following directive for the 11th Red Army and the Volga-Caspian military flotilla to initiate an offensive towards Baku:The day after that, Hajinsky declared his failure to create a new cabinet. On 24 April, the Bolshevik army started its mobilization and was occupying the government buildings and started imposing Martial laws on Baku. On 25 April, the operations continued and all Communist party committees were threatened with immediate death if they do not subordinate to orders. In the midnight of 27 April, the Azerbaijani government found out that Russian troops were entering the country from the north and, as almost all military power was sent to Karabakh, there was only a small portion of the army available to meet them. General Aliagha Shikhlinski could not implement military actions to stop Russian advancements towards Baku. On the same day, the Russian Communist Party, Azerbaijan Communist Party, and the Caucasian Regional Committee established The Azerbaijani Revolutionary Committee, which was proclaimed to be the only lawful authority in the country. Nariman Narimanov was proclaimed as the head of The Azerbaijani Revolutionary Committee; it also included members such as Mirza Davud Huseynov, Ghazanfar Musabakov, Hamid Sultanov, Dadash Buniatzada, Alimov, and Ali Heydar Garayev.  As soon as AzRevKom was founded, Sultanov presented an ultimatum to the Parliament: surrender, transfer its powers, and dissolve within 12 hours.

Parliament came to a conclusion to pass the authority to the Communist Party under the following conditions: 

Thus, the Azerbaijan Democratic Republic stopped its existence on 28 April 1920. The occupation of Azerbaijan had economic reasons, as well as political. The most prominent reason for the occupation was Azerbaijan oil, which would help the Soviets to realize their plans for expanding their territories. 

According to Russian historian A.B. Shirokorad, the Soviet invasion of Azerbaijan was carried out using a standard Bolshevik template: a local revolutionary committee starts a real or "virtual" worker riots and requests support from the Red Army. This scheme would be used again during the Soviet invasions in Hungary (1956) and Czechoslovakia (1968). On 28 April 1920, the Baku Revolutionary Committee filed a formal request for help with the Soviet Russian Government. But a day before, the 11th Red Army, including the 26th, 28th, and 32nd rifle divisions and 2nd mounted corps (over 30,000 soldiers), already invaded the territory of Azerbaijan.

References

Bibliography

See also
 Red Army invasion of Georgia
 Azerbaijan Democratic Republic

Conflicts in 1920
Russian Civil War
Communism in Azerbaijan
Azerbaijan Soviet Socialist Republic
Azerbaijan Democratic Republic
Invasions by the Soviet Union
Wars involving the Soviet Union
Wars involving Russia
April 1920 events
May 1920 events